Bodø is a municipality in Nordland county, Norway. It is part of the traditional region of Salten. The administrative centre of the municipality is the town of Bodø (which is also the capital of Nordland county). Some of the notable villages in Bodø include Misvær, Skjerstad, Saltstraumen, Løding, Løpsmarka, Kjerringøy, Sørvær, and Fenes.

The municipality of Bodø is located just north of the Arctic Circle and the town of Bodø is the largest urban area and town in Nordland county, and the second largest town in North Norway. The  municipality is the 66th largest by area out of the 356 municipalities in Norway. Bodø is the 19th most populous municipality in Norway with a population of 52,803.

Bodø was named one of the European Capitals of Culture for 2024. It is also home to football club Bodø/Glimt, the northernmost club to win a European league competition.

History

The village of Bodø was granted township status in 1816 and soon after, in 1818, it was known for the Bodø affair, smuggling by British merchants that later were compensated by Norway. The town of Bodø was established as a municipality on 1 January 1838 (see formannskapsdistrikt law). On 1 January 1938, a part of the neighboring municipality of Bodin (population: 559) was transferred into the town of Bodø. On 1 January 1959, another part of Bodin (population: 1,303) was transferred into Bodø.

During the 1960s, there were many municipal mergers across Norway due to the work of the Schei Committee. On 1 January 1968, the town of Bodø (population: 14,252) was merged with the municipality of Bodin (population: 13,323) and this created the much larger Bodø Municipality. On 1 January 1984, the Tårnvika and Øygården areas (population: 22) northeast of the village of Kjerringøy in Sørfold Municipality was transferred to Bodø. On 1 January 2005, the entire municipality of Skjerstad was merged into the municipality of Bodø.

World War II
Most of the town of Bodø was destroyed during a Luftwaffe attack on 27 May 1940. Six thousand people were living in Bodø, and 3500 people lost their homes in the attack. Fifteen people died during the air attack (two British soldiers and 13 Norwegians).

Due to the acute lack of housing, the Swedish Government helped build 107 apartments in the winter of 1941. These houses were built tightly together just outside the town. This small area, today in the heart of Bodø, is still called Svenskebyen ("the Swedish Town"). The town was subsequently rebuilt after the war. The rebuilding ended in 1959 with the completion of the new town hall. German shipping in and around Bodø was attacked in October 1943 in Operation Leader.

Off Bodø the submarine HMS Syrtis was lost on or around 28 March 1944 with all hands. Her location is currently unknown.

Toponymy
The municipality is named after the old Bodøgård farm, since the town was built on its ground.

Coat of arms
The coat of arms was first approved in 1889. It showed a midnight sun above a boat on the sea in front of a mountain range. The current version which is a simplified, modern version of the old arms was granted on 24 July 1959. The official blazon is "Gules, a sun Or". This means the arms have a red field (background) and the charge is a sun. The sun has a tincture of Or which means it is commonly colored yellow, but if it is made out of metal, then gold is used. The sun was chosen since Bodø was the first town in Northern Norway, and it experiences the midnight sun every year. The arms were designed by Hallvard Trætteberg.

Geography

The municipality lies just north of the Arctic Circle where the midnight sun is visible from 1 June to 13 July. Due to atmospheric refraction, there is no true polar night in Bodø, but because of the mountains south of Bodø, the sun is not visible in parts of the municipality from early December to early January. The average number of sun-hours in Bodø is highest in June with a daily average of 22.1 hours.

With its scenic setting and authentic buildings, several movies have been shot at this little port, including Benoni og Rosa (based on Knut Hamsun's novel), I am Dina, and Telegrafisten.

Skjerstad Fjord in the eastern part of Bodø passes through the Saltstraumen into the Saltfjorden. The Saltfjorden then flows west into the Vestfjorden. Lakes in the region include Fjærvatnet, Gjømmervatnet, Heggmovatnet, Soløyvatnet, Valnesvatnet, and Vatnvatnet.

There are also several islands and island groups in Bodø. The islands of Straumøya and Knaplundsøya are in the Saltfjorden. Several bridges connect these islands to the mainland: Åselistraumen Bridge, Indre Sunnan Bridge, and Saltstraumen Bridge. The islands of Landegode, Helligvær, Bliksvær, and Karlsøyvær all lie in the Vestfjorden. Several lighthouses are also located out in the Vestfjorden: Bjørnøy Lighthouse, Grytøy Lighthouse, Landegode Lighthouse, Nyholmen Lighthouse, and Tennholmen Lighthouse.

Climate
Bodø is the northernmost city in the world and the only inside the Arctic Circle with a temperate four-season climate (not a subarctic climate). At the same latitude but further east in Scandinavia, some of the coldest and most continental areas in the region are found, making a sharp contrast with Bodø. The weather in Bodø depends on weather patterns; long-lasting weather patterns with Atlantic lows bringing rain and overcast skies. This can occur in all seasons, but so can sunny weather with Highs over Northern Scandinavia and Western Russia. The spring month May has ranged from 129 sunhours in 1964 to 322 sunhours in May 1981; in July recorded sunhours have ranged from just 48 sunhours in 1984 (the cloudiest recorded summer month) to 344 sunhours in July 2003, and October has ranged from 10 to 103 sunhours (sun recorded 1961–2005). The "midnight sun" is above the horizon from 1 June to 14 July (44 days), and the period with continuous daylight lasts a bit longer. In spite of having midnight sun, Bodø still lacks true polar nights as the sun is barely above the horizon at noon on the darkest days in December due to atmospheric refraction, but being very low it is usually blocked by mountains or stays too weak to register. Daylength increases from less than two hours 1 to 6 January hours on 31 January, and then to nearly 10 hours by late February. By mid-April daylength is approaching 16 hours, reaching 24 hours on 1 June.
 
Snow cover during winter varies, and is often sparse or lacking in the city center, while being more reliable only slightly inland or at some altitude. Located on a peninsula in the Norwegian Sea, Bodø is known to be a city with potential for strong winds, both from southwest and east.

The average date for the last overnight freeze (low below ) in spring is 5 May and average date for first freeze in autumn is 12 October (1981–2010 average) giving a frost-free season of 159 days. Recent decades have seen warming, and there has been no overnight air frost in June since 1981.

The Helligvær islands northwest of mainland Bodø are slightly more oceanic with all winter months above freezing and a cooler summer (a subpolar oceanic Cfc climate in the Köppen classification). As the islands are more exposed to the sea (North Atlantic Drift), they are a little more similar to that of Røst.

This is an earlier climate normal at Bodø Airport. This normal shows a slightly cooler average annual temperature, less sunshine hours and less precipitation but more precipitation days.

Nature

Besides Saltstraumen, the municipality of Bodø has much wilderness for hikers. The area is inhabited by a large number of white-tailed eagles. Sjunkhatten National Park is partly located in Bodø municipality, and there are also 17 nature reserves. Sundstraumlian nature reserve has undisturbed mixed forest with marble bedrock, Skånland with coastal pine forest, Børvatnet protecting a birch forest with many orchids, and Bliksvær nature reserve with well-preserved coastal nature of many types and a rich bird life, making it a Ramsar site as well.

Government
All municipalities in Norway, including Bodø, are responsible for primary education (through 10th grade), outpatient health services, senior citizen services, unemployment and other social services, zoning, economic development, and municipal roads. The municipality is governed by a municipal council of elected representatives, which in turn elect a mayor. The municipality falls under the Salten District Court and the Hålogaland Court of Appeal.

Municipal council
The municipal council  of Bodø is made up of 39 representatives that are elected to four year terms. The party breakdown of the council is as follows:

Mayors
The mayors of Bodø:

 1838-1841: Severin Frederich Holmer
 1842-1842: Melchior Koch
 1843-1843: Mads Mortensen
 1844-1844: Johan Tønnessen
 1844-1845: Mads Mortensen
 1846-1846: Jakob Lorentz Bar Tohrsen
 1846-1847: Joachim Andreas Koht
 1847-1850: Jakob Lorentz Bar Tohrsen
 1850: Severin Frederich Holmer
 1851: Melchior Koch
 1852: Berent Pettersen
 1853: Lorentz Wittrup Lied
 1854: Stig Othard Arntzen
 1855: Jens Width
 1856: Ole M. Groth
 1857: Stig Othard Arntzen
 1858: Jens Cornelius Koch
 1859: Ole M. Groth
 1860: Jens Cornelius Koch
 1861: Vilhelm Bernhard Jentoft
 1862: Carl Jakhelln
 1863: Hans H. Koch
 1864: Stig Othard Arntzen
 1865: Ole M. Groth
 1866: Christian Albrigt Jakhelln 
 1867: Ole M. Groth
 1868: Christian Albrigt Jakhelln
 1869-1870: Jens Cornelius Koch
 1871: Carl Jakhelln
 1871: Vilhelm Bernhard Jentoft
 1872: Ole M. Groth
 1872-1875: Christian H. Mathiesen
 1875-1877: Rasmus Theisen
 1878: Jens Cornelius Koch
 1879: Rasmus Theisen
 1880: Jens Cornelius Koch
 1881-1882: Reinholdt Gram Breien
 1883: Otto Koch
 1884: Reinholdt Gram Breien
 1885: Otto Koch
 1886: Jakob Hansen
 1887: Jacob Olsen Vig
 1887-1889: Rasmus Schjølberg
 1890: Thor Grøner
 1891: Christian Albrigt Jakhelln 
 1892: Rasmus Schjølberg
 1893: Otto Koch
 1894: Rasmus Schjølberg
 1895: Otto Koch
 1895: Bertrand Gundersen
 1896: Rasmus Schjølberg
 1897: Bertrand Gundersen
 1898: Rasmus Schjølberg
 1899-1900: Christian Jakhelln
 1901: Haakon Evjenth
 1902: Christian Jakhelln
 1903: Rasmus Schjølberg
 1903-1904: Oskar Thue
 1905-1907: Arnt Angell
 1908-1910: Christian Jakhelln
 1911-1912: Johan Lund
 1913-1913: Martin Christoffersen
 1914-1915: Ole Kristian Pedersen Bakken
 1916: Haakon Evjenth
 1917: Christian Jakhelln
 1918: Ole Kristian Pedersen Bakken
 1919: Christian Jakhelln
 1923-1925: Ove Christian O. Owe
 1926-1928: Haakon Evjenth
 1929-1931: Johannes Høyer (H)
 1932-1934: Haakon Koch (H)
 1935-1937: Magnus Fische (H)
 1938-1940: Haakon Koch (H)
 1941-1943: Peder Johannes Seglem (NS)
 1943-1945: Hans Kristensen (NS)
 1945-1945: Haakon Koch (H)
 1946-1948: Leif Aune
 1948-1949: Morten Olsen 
 1950-1961: Birger Hals (Ap)
 1962-1967: Olav Hagen (Ap)
 1968-1969: Birger Hals (Ap)
 1970-1971: Henry Forsaa (Ap)
 1972-1975: Olav Hagen (Ap)
 1976-1978: Gunhild Støver (H)
 1978-1983: Roar Nøstvik (H)
 1984-1995: Per Pettersen (Ap)
 1995-1999: Oddleif Olavsen (H)
 1999-2011: Odd-Tore Fygle (Ap)
 2011-2015: Ole-Henrik Hjartøy (H)
 2015-present: Ida Maria Pinnerød (Ap)

Transportation
As the northern terminus of the Nordland Line, the town of Bodø is the northern end of Vy network. However, travellers going further north will often switch to a connecting bus in the nearby town of Fauske bound for the town of Narvik. There is also a railway from Narvik to Kiruna in Sweden, and further into the Swedish rail network. Bodø Station was completed in 1961. Bodø Airport lies just south of the city centre and was opened in 1952. The airport served 1,733,330 passengers in 2015 and is the site of Bodø Air Traffic Control Center. The airline Widerøe has its head office in Bodø. Ferries run between Bodø and the Lofoten Islands to the west.

Institutions

The main campus of Nord University is located  outside the city centre. Twelve thousand undergraduate and graduate students study at the university.

Bodø is the location of the only police academy in Norway outside Oslo. The Norwegian Civil Aviation Authority is situated in Bodø, as is the Joint Rescue Coordination Centre of Northern Norway. The Norwegian Armed Forces headquarters for North Norway is located at Reitan, east of the city. The main hospital is Nordlandssykehuset HF, which has local, regional, and national areas of responsibility. SB Nordlandsbuss has its headquarters in Bodø, as does Bodø Energi and Nordlandsbanken.

The largest shopping centre in Nordland, City Nord, is located in the town of Bodø.

Military

Bodø has a long history with the Norwegian Armed Forces, and especially the Royal Norwegian Air Force (RNoAF). The Norwegian Armed Forces Joint Operational Headquarters are located at Reitan, east of Bodø. Parts of NATO air forces attending the annual Cold Response are stationed at Bodø Main Air Station. Bodø MAS was a major Norwegian military air base, housing two-thirds of Norway's F-16 fighter force and two of RNoAFs SAR Sea Kings. In January 2022, the F-16s were retired from service, significantly reducing the importance of Bodø as an air station.
Bodin Leir located near the air station was an RNoAF recruit school including Norwegian Advanced Surface to Air Missile System personnel and a national response unit. The base was central during the Cold War due to its strategic location and proximity to the Soviet Union. It would have been vital in the build-up of NATO air and land forces to defend Norway, and thus the entire northern flank of NATO, in a war with the Warsaw Pact. It could also have been used as a forward base for American bombers. Now Bodin Leir is an camp to house military personnel for The Norwegian Joint Headquarters and Bodø Main Air Station.

Bodø has a street named General Fleischer's Gate in honour of Carl Gustav Fleischer.

Bodø received international attention during the U-2 Crisis in May 1960, when it became known that the American U-2 pilot Gary Powers had been shot down over the Soviet Union on his way from Pakistan to Bodø.

Culture

Bodø's local newspapers are the Avisa Nordland and the on-line newspaper BodøNu.

The Norwegian Aviation Museum and The Nordland Museum are located in Bodø. The Nordland Museum (Nordlandsmuseet) consists of 18 smaller museums, which are located in different cities in the Nordland region. The main Nordland Museum institution is the Bodø City Museum, where the museum administration has its headquarters. The Bodø City Museum has four permanent exhibitions: The Lofoten Fisheries, a Sami exhibit, a Viking treasure, and an exhibition about Bodø's history from 1816 to 2000. In addition, the most recent smaller institution to open as part of the Nordland Museum was The Norwegian Jekt Trade Museum. It opened in 2019, and is located just outside of the city centre.

The Bodø Cathedral was built in 1956, representing post-war architecture, whereas the Bodin Church just outside the city centre dates from the 13th century, representing a typical medieval stone church.

The new cultural centre "Stormen" (the storm) was opened in 2014. It contains a library, a concert hall and theater. The building was designed by Daniel Rosbottom and David Howarth from London-based DRDH Architects. The official art projects in Stormen were curated by KORO.

Bodø is host to the cultural festivals Nordland Musikkfestuke, Parkenfestivalen and the Opptur festival every summer, as well as the free and volunteer based Bodø Hardcore Festival in early winter. The avant-garde and experimental contemporary music festival Nødutgangfestivalen has been held annually since 2006.

Fram Kino was the first cinema in Norway. It was started in the year 1908.

Churches

The Church of Norway has six parishes within the municipality of Bodø. It is part of the Bodø domprosti (arch-deanery) in the Diocese of Sør-Hålogaland.

Sports
Bodø's main professional team is the football club Bodø/Glimt, playing in Eliteserien, the top division of football in Norway, of which they are the current champions and currently playing in the 2022-23 UEFA Europa League.

In addition to Bodø/Glimt, Bodø has had several teams at national top level, including Grand Bodø (women's football), Junkeren (women's handball) and Bodø HK (men's handball).

The most well-known sporting arena in Bodø is Aspmyra Stadion, which in addition to being the home of Bodø/Glimt has hosted one international match.
Also, the multi-purpose indoor Bodø Spektrum, contains full-size football and handball courts, as well as several swimming and bathing facilities.

The town is also home of Bodø Barbarians, a leading rugby league team.

Notable people

Public Service 

 Paul Steenstrup Koht (1844–1892) educator and politician, a penchant for Greek and Roman poetry 
 Christian Albrecht Jakhelln (1863–1945) a businessperson and politician, often served as Mayor
 Johannes J. Johannessen (1872–1915) a United States Navy sailor, received the Medal of Honor
 Ole Mikal Kobbe (1881–1955) a Norwegian military officer and politician
 Sigmund Olaf Plytt Mowinckel (1884 in Kjerringøy – 1965) a professor, theologian and biblical scholar
 Tore Gjelsvik (1916–2006) a geologist, polar explorer and a role in the Norwegian resistance 
 Jon Tørset (born 1940) a Norwegian politician, as county Mayor of Nordland 1999–2007
 Tor Berger Jørgensen (born 1945) Bishop of the Diocese of Sør-Hålogaland 2006–2015
 Ann-Helen Fjeldstad Jusnes (born 1956) Bishop of the Diocese of Sør-Hålogaland since 2016
 Torild Skogsholm (born 1959) a politician, now the director of the Oslo tram company Oslo Sporvognsdrift
 Marie Simonsen (born 1962) a Norwegian journalist, political editor of Dagbladet
 Vidar Helgesen (born 1968) a Norwegian diplomat and politician
 Tom Cato Karlsen (born 1974) a politician, anesthesiologist and County Governor of Nordland

The Arts 

 Adelsteen Normann (1848–1918) a Norwegian painter who worked in Berlin
 Håkon Evjenth (1894–1951) a jurist, non-fiction writer, short-story writer and children's writer
 Asbjørn Toms (1915–1990) a Norwegian actor, stage director and playwright
 Jonas Fjeld (born 1952) a Norwegian singer, songwriter, and guitarist
 Jan Gunnar Hoff (born 1958) a Norwegian jazz pianist, composer, arranger and professor
 Morten Abel (born 1962) a Norwegian pop artist
 Per Sundnes (born 1966) a Norwegian journalist and talk show host
 Susanne Lundeng (born 1969) a Norwegian traditional folk musician, fiddler and composer
 Endre Lund Eriksen (born 1977) a Norwegian author and politician
 Caroline Ailin (born 1989) a Norwegian singer and songwriter based in London

Sport 

 Christian Berg (born 1978) a retired Norwegian footballer with over 320 club caps
 Harald Berg (born 1941) a former footballer with 43 caps for Norway 
 Ørjan Berg (born 1968) a former Norwegian footballer with 383 club caps and 19 for Norway 
 Runar Berg (born 1970) a retired Norwegian footballer with 450 club caps and 5 for Norway 
 Marianne Dahlmo (born 1965) a former cross-country skier, team silver medallist at the 1988 Winter Olympics
 Ann Cathrin Eriksen (born 1971) a former team handball player, team bronze medallist at the 2000 Summer Olympics
 Jens Petter Hauge (born 1999) footballer who currently plays for Belgian club K.A.A. Gent
 Tor Helness (born 1957) a professional bridge player, now living in Monaco
 Mini Jakobsen (born 1965 in Gravdal) a former footballer with 372 club caps and 65 for Norway 
 Anders Konradsen (born 1990) a Norwegian footballer with over 270 club caps and 8 for Norway 
 Kjell Søbak (born 1957) a former biathlete, team silver medallist at the 1984 Summer Olympics
 Alexander Tettey (born 1986) a Norwegian footballer with 380 club caps and 34 for Norway 
 Morten Thoresen (born 1997) a Norwegian Greco-Roman wrestler, gold medallist at the 2020 European Wrestling Championships^
 Martin Wiig (born 1983) a retired Norwegian footballer with 350 club caps

References

External links
Municipal fact sheet from Statistics Norway 
Bodo online camera

Municipality website 

 
Municipalities of Nordland
Populated coastal places in Norway
Populated places of Arctic Norway
1838 establishments in Norway